Burl is an EP by Killdozer, released in November, 1986 through Touch and Go Records.

Track listing

Personnel
Killdozer
Michael Gerald – vocals, bass guitar
Bill Hobson – guitar
Dan Hobson – drums, percussion
Production and additional personnel
Rick Canzano – engineering
Corey Rusk – production
Butch Vig – production, piano
The Wisconsin Boys Choir – backing vocals on "I'm Not Lisa"

References 

1986 EPs
Albums produced by Butch Vig
Killdozer (band) albums
Touch and Go Records EPs